Pirç (in Albanian) or Pirče (in Serbian; Пирче) is a village in the municipality of Mitrovica in the District of Mitrovica, Kosovo. According to the 2011 census, it had 511 inhabitants, all of whom were Albanian.

Notes

References

Villages in Mitrovica, Kosovo